The Khudosey is a river in the West Siberian Plain, Russia. It is a right tributary of the Taz.

Course
It meets the right bank of the Taz  from its mouth in the Taz Estuary of the Kara Sea.

Tributaries   
The river is frozen between late October and late May.

See also
List of rivers of Russia

References

Rivers of Yamalo-Nenets Autonomous Okrug
Rivers of Krasnoyarsk Krai
Tributaries of the Taz